Broken beat (sometimes referred to as "bruk") is an electronic dance music genre characterized by syncopated beats and tense rhythms, including staggered or punctuated snare beats and/or hand claps. It has been heavily influenced by styles such as jazz-funk and R&B. Artists in this area typically emerged from drum and bass, house, hip hop, techno or acid jazz scenes.

History
Broken beat first appeared in the late 1990s and was pioneered by Bugz in the Attic, IG Culture, and the release of the 4hero album, Two Pages, was influential on the emerging sound and scene. John Bush from All Music called it "about as fusion-soaked as it gets." Appearing in the western parts of London, the genre is also referred to as West London, mainly because Goya Music's offices were in London's Ladbroke Grove, W11, as were most of the participating artists' studios.

Bugz in the Attic's  Neon Phusion, Afronaught & IG Culture are credited with kick-starting the scene with numerous releases under various monikers,  and the New Sector Movements releases for People Music. The sound created combined a variety of music styles including funk, soul, and hip-hop. The transition was to a more abstract form of drum and bass. Many artists that started releasing through 4hero's Reinforced label are now considered pioneers of broken beat. Simultaneously, established techno artists like Carl Craig and Stacey Pullen experimented with the music they were making, trying to add jazz elements and breaks to their sound. As the music is still based on classic Detroit techno and usually has a harder sound, it is sometimes referred to as broken techno. This eclectic mixture was picked up by the Detroit and jazz-affiliated UK techno producers Kirk Degiorgio or As One and Ian O'Brien, who tried to form it into a more soulful variation which further influenced the development of the broken beat genre.

Influences
Broken beat draws from 1970s jazz-funk and has been influenced by artists such as Lonnie Liston Smith, The Mizell Brothers (producers for Donald Byrd, Bobbi Humphrey and Johnny Hammond in the mid-1970s), Herbie Hancock, George Duke, and others. One might also hear echos of disco, 1980s contemporary R&B and funk (Shalamar, Prince), early electronica (Kraftwerk), hip hop ("Planet Rock"), 1980s new wave (Depeche Mode, New Order), house and techno in broken beat.

Scene
Regular nights that play this genre of music include Co-op, the brainchild of Bugz in the Attic's Mark Force,  held at Velvet Room,  and then a few years later moving on to Plastic People, a famous club located in London, for a number of years before re-launching at East Village - both in Shoreditch. In 2008 Afronaut and Bruce Q (Liquid Fusion) teamed up for a monthly Co-Op sessions which was launched  at Concrete in Birmingham, UK. Liquid Fusion ran every Sunday at The living Room (2000-2002) first then onto Zinc (2002-2008). It had a following of several Hundred weekly. Another night is Inspiration Information, previously at Notting Hill Arts Club but now at East Village in Shoreditch.

See also
 Techno
 Jungle and Drum and Bass
 Reggae and Dub
 Hip Hop
 House 
 Jazz
 Soul, Rare Groove and Boogie

References

20th-century music genres
21st-century music genres
Breakbeat genres
English styles of music
Electronic dance music genres